James Jinkins (born August 8, 1953) is an American animator, cartoonist, and children's author. He is best known as the creator of the animated Doug television series which was later the basis for a feature film. Jinkins also created PB&J Otter, as well as several other shows produced by his two companies, Jumbo Pictures and Cartoon Pizza.

Background and career
Jinkins was born in Richmond, Virginia, and lived there during his childhood. His experiences growing up in Richmond would serve as an inspiration for the fictional town of Bluffington, Virginia, in the series Doug. Jinkins was also an actor on the old Nickelodeon series Pinwheel and Hocus Focus, and a graphic designer on By the Way and Video Comics. After his first tenure with Nickelodeon, he went to work for Children's Television Workshop, becoming the graphics director for their show Square One Television.

Later, Jinkins worked in advertising, creating television commercials and promotions featuring a young boy and a dog, who would become the main characters of his major creation, Doug. Jinkins had developed Doug Funnie through doodles during the early days of his career. Doug and his dog Porkchop first appeared in Jinkins' book Doug Got a New Pair of Shoes, which led to his creating an animated pilot titled Doug Can't Dance. He sold the Doug pilot to Nickelodeon. The pilot tested higher than any other pilot for the network at the time. Jinkins established Jumbo Pictures in 1990 to produce Doug for Nickelodeon. Doug went on to become one of Nickelodeon's most popular and successful series. Jinkins has also served as executive producer and voice director for Doug as well as writing only two episodes. Jinkins also created a TV show for Nick Jr., Allegra's Window.

Dougs success was noticed by Disney executives. In 1996, Jinkins sold Jumbo Pictures to Disney. Disney then developed Disney's Doug (originally Brand Spanking New! Doug) as part of their "One Saturday Morning" lineup.

Jinkins and his team at Jumbo Pictures have produced the PB&J Otter and 101 Dalmatians: The Series animated series and feature film Doug's 1st Movie for Disney. Jinkins has also founded an independent company, Cartoon Pizza, which produced shows such as JoJo's Circus, Stanley, Stanley's Dinosaur Round-Up, HoopDogz, and Pinky Dinky Doo.

As of 2017, Jinkins was living in Brunswick, Georgia where he ran a workshop.

Jinkins on Doug

References

External links

Cartoon Pizza

1953 births
Animators from Virginia
American television directors
American animated film directors
American animated film producers
American television writers
American male television writers
Nickelodeon Animation Studio people
Disney Television Animation people
Showrunners
Living people
Lipscomb University alumni
Ohio State University alumni
Artists from Richmond, Virginia
American voice directors
Screenwriters from Virginia
Doug (TV series)
Television producers from Virginia
Disney people